Lathyrus linifolius is a species of pea, commonly called bitter vetch or heath pea. The name bitter vetch is also sometimes used for Vicia ervilia and also for Vicia orobus. The tubers of Lathyrus linifolius were formerly used as an appetite suppressant in medieval Scotland, and this use has brought the plant to recent medical attention. Attempts are being made to cultivate the plant on a commercial scale.

Description
Lathyrus linifolius is a perennial plant with dark-coloured tubers attached to the roots. The leaves are alternate with short winged stalks and large stipules. The leaf blades are pinnate with two to four pairs of narrow lanceolate leaflets with blunt tips, entire margins and no tendrils. These have five sepals and five petals and are irregular. The uppermost petal is known as the "standard", the lateral two as the "wings" and the lowest two are joined to form the "keel". There are ten stamens and a single carpel. The fruit is a long reddish-brown pod containing up to ten seeds. This plant flowers in May and June.

Distribution and habitat
Lathyrus linifolius is native to Europe and parts of Asia. Its typical habitat is rough grassy places, broad-leaved woodland, forest margins, hedgerows and banks.

Uses
This plant was formerly an ingredient of the Highland diet when food was scarce until the 18th century, when the potato became an important crop in the region. The small tubers were removed from the roots and dried. Once eaten, they prevented thirst and hunger pangs. Certain medieval herbals claimed that this effect could last for days or even weeks. It is surmised that this effect derives from the presence in them of transethanol.

The plant may be the one eaten by Roman soldiers in the battle of Dyrrhacium in 48 BCE.

References

External links
Heath Pea site for Schools, Crofters and Farmers
The bitter pea that is a master of disguise

linifolius
Flora of Europe